The following lists events that happened during 2004 in the Grand Duchy of Luxembourg.

Incumbents

Events

January – March
 5 February – SES Americom launches its AMC-10 satellite.

April – June
 27 April – Jean-Claude Juncker delivers his tenth State of the Nation address.
 16 May – The 2003-04 season of the  National Division finishes, with Jeunesse Esch winning the title.
 19 May – SES Americom launches its AMC-11 satellite.
 22 May – F91 Dudelange win the Luxembourg Cup, beating FC Etzella Ettelbruck 3-1 after extra time in the final.
 30 May – Maxime Monfort wins the 2004 Tour de Luxembourg, with Quick-Step–Davitamon picking up the team title.
 13 June – Legislative and European elections are held.  The CSV add five seats in the Chamber, mostly at the expense of the DP, and one in the European Parliament from the LSAP.

July – September
 19 July – Ministers and ministerial briefs are reorganised in an attempt to hold together the coalition between the CSV and the DP.
 21 July – Luxembourgish Wikipedia is launched.
 31 July – Jean-Claude Juncker forms a new government, with Jean Asselborn as his deputy.
 7 August – The 2004-05 season of the  National Division kicks off.
 27 September – Jorge Sampaio, President of Portugal, pays a state visit.

October – December
 15 October – SES Americom launches its AMC-15 satellite.
 15 October – Romain Nati is appointed to the Council of State, replacing Nicolas Schmit, who resigned in July.
 19 November – The constitution is amended.
 24 November – The wife and four children of Prince Jean are granted the titles of 'Prince(ss) of Nassau', replacing their titles of 'Count(ess)'.
 30 November – The Luxembourg investigation into the Clearstream Affair is dropped under the statute of limitations.
 17 December – SES Americom launches its AMC-16 satellite.
 20 December – Guy Hellers replaces Allan Simonsen as coach of the Luxembourg national football team.
 26 December – 3 Luxembourgers are among the victims of the 2004 Indian Ocean tsunami.

Births

Deaths
 6 January – Nicolas Mosar, politician
 1 July – Paul Beghin, politician and jurist
 21 October – Jean Dondelinger, diplomat and politician
 21 December – Prince Lennart, Duke of Småland

Footnotes

 
Years of the 21st century in Luxembourg
Luxembourg
Luxembourg